RSC Hamsik Academy is a Slovak association football club located in Rakytovce. It currently plays in 3. liga (3rd tier in Slovak football system). The club was founded in 1993.

Former names 
 1986 – TJ STS Rakytovce
 1992 – ŠK Kvasna Rakytovce
 1995 – ŠK Stapex Rakytovce
 1997 – FK Rakytovce 85
 2009 – MFK Banská Bystrica
 2013 – FK Rakytovce
 2022 – Merged with JUPIE Futbalová škola Mareka Hamšíka to RSC Hamsik Academy

Colors and badge 
Its colors are blue and white.

External links
Futbalnet profile 
Official club website

References

Football clubs in Slovakia
Association football clubs established in 1993
1993 establishments in Slovakia